Máté Szabó (born 26 January 1999) is a Hungarian professional footballer who plays for Szentlőrinc.

Career statistics
.

References

1999 births
Living people
Footballers from Budapest
Hungarian footballers
Hungary youth international footballers
Hungary under-21 international footballers
Association football forwards
Puskás Akadémia FC II players
Puskás Akadémia FC players
Csákvári TK players
Budafoki LC footballers
Szentlőrinci SE footballers
Nemzeti Bajnokság I players
Nemzeti Bajnokság II players
Nemzeti Bajnokság III players
21st-century Hungarian people